Imad Abullah Sarah (born 1968) is a Syrian politician who served as Information Minister in the Imad Khamis government and First Hussein Arnous government.

References 

Living people
1968 births
Syrian ministers of information
21st-century Syrian politicians

Damascus University alumni
Date of birth missing (living people)